Brodie Moles (born 7 November 1985) is an Australian rules football player in the Australian Football League (AFL).

After being recruited at pick 16 in the 2008 AFL Rookie draft by the Geelong Football Club. he was delisted at the end of the 2009 season without making his AFL debut. The Western Bulldogs then selected him with pick 19 in the 2010 AFL Rookie draft under the new mature-age rookie rules. He made his AFL debut for the Bulldogs in round two of the 2010 AFL season.

Moles spent the majority of his junior career in Tasmania, and originally played mainly as a quick forward with good goal sense, but has developed into a skilful midfielder.

References

Western Bulldogs players
Living people
1985 births
Australian rules footballers from Tasmania
Tasmanian Devils Football Club players
Darwin Football Club players
Bairnsdale Football Club players
Williamstown Football Club players
Glenorchy Football Club players